William Philip Molyneux, 4th Earl of Sefton,  (14 October 1835 – 27 June 1897) was a British peer.

Born Viscount Molyneux, he was the eldest son of Charles Molyneux, 3rd Earl of Sefton and his wife, Mary. He was educated at Eton College, Berks. In 1854, Molyneux became an ensign in the Grenadier Guards and inherited his father's earldom the following year. He was promoted to captain in 1857, retiring a year later, when he was appointed Lord Lieutenant of Lancashire.

On 18 July 1866, Lord Sefton married Hon. Cecil Emily Jolliffe (1838–1899), the fifth daughter of William Jolliffe, 1st Baron Hylton. They had five children:

Charles William Hylton, styled Viscount Molyneux (1867–1901), later 5th Earl of Sefton.
Lady Gertrude Eleanor (1868–1937)
Lady Rose Mary (c.1870–1905)
Hon. Osbert Cecil (1871–1930), later 6th Earl of Sefton.
Hon. Richard Frederick (1873–1954)

Lord Sefton was appointed a Knight of the Garter in 1885. In 1886, he built Abbeystead House in the forest of Wyresdale, Lancashire as a 'private shooting lodge on a grand scale'. On his death in 1897, his titles passed to his eldest son, Charles.

The family seats were : Croxteth Hall, Lancs ; Abbeystead House, Lancs ; Sefton House, Belgravia Sq., London

Sources

Cokayne et al., The Complete Peerage

External links

1835 births
1897 deaths
Grenadier Guards officers
Knights of the Garter
Lord-Lieutenants of Lancashire
People educated at Eton College
Presidents of the Marylebone Cricket Club
Earls of Sefton